Abati is a surname. It was used by an ancient noble family of Florence. 

Notable people with the surname include:

 Antonio Abati (died 1667), Italian poet
 Baldo Angelo Abati (sixteenth century), Italian naturalist
 Joaquín Abati (1865–1936), Spanish writer
 Joël Abati (born 1970), French handball player
 Megliore degli Abati (thirteenth century), Italian poet
 Niccolò dell'Abbate (1509 or 1512 – 1571), Italian painter
 Reuben Abati (born 1965), Nigerian newspaper columnist

Other uses
 The Abati people, a fictional ethnic group in H. Rider Haggard's adventure novel Queen Sheba's Ring
 Abati, Iran, village
 Marauna abati, species of beetle in the family Cerambycidae

References

Italian-language surnames